Skanderbeg (sometimes Skanderbeg, Scanderbeg, Skenderbeg or Skënderbeu) may refer to:

People 
 George Kastrioti Skanderbeg (1405–1468), Albanian nobleman and military commander, national hero
 Skenderbeg Crnojević (1457–1530), member of the Crnojević family of Zeta and Ottoman sanjakbey of the Sanjak of Scutari in 1513–30
 Skenderbeg Mihajlović (1478–1504), sanjakbey of the Sanjak of Bosnia in 1478–80, 1485–91 and 1499–1504
 Military pseudonym of Rafael Moshe Kamhi (1870—1970), Macedonian revolutionary 
 William, Prince of Albania (1876–1945), also known as Skanderbeg II
 Zog of Albania (1895–1961), also known as Skanderbeg III

Places 
 Skanderbeg Square in Tirana, Albania
 Skanderbeg Square in Pristina, Kosovo
 Skanderbeg Square in Skopje, Macedonia
 Skanderbeg Museum in Tirana, Albania
 Skanderbeg Monument (Tirana) in Tirana, Albania
 Skanderbeg Military University in Tirana, Albania
 Stadiumi Skënderbeu, stadium
 Palazzo Skanderbeg, a Roman palazzo in Rome, Italy
 Piazza Scanderbeg, Square in Rome

Culture 
 The Great Warrior Skanderbeg, a 1953 Albanian film
 Scanderbeg (opera) (1718), by Antonio Vivaldi
 Scanderberg, an opera by François Francoeur and François Rebel (1735)

Other 
 21st Waffen Mountain Division of the SS Skanderbeg (1st Albanian), Albanian SS division, 1944–45
 Skanderbeg (military unit), Albanian quisling military unit assigned to the 14th Italian Army Corps, to participate in the Italian counteroffensive against insurgents in Montenegro, during the Uprising in Montenegro in 1941.
 KF Skënderbeu Korçë, football team in Korçë, Albania
 Order of Skanderbeg, an honorary decoration given in Albania to Albanian and foreign citizens that have made an important contribution to the defence, reinforcement and development of Albania and is awarded by the Albanian President
 Skanderbeg (steamboat), a steamboat used for transport of the goods and passengers mostly on the Skadar Lake in Montenegro in the first half of the 20th century